Batton is an English and French surname with several proposed etymologies. In English it may be a diminutive form of Batt – itself derived from the Middle English Batte, a pet form of Bartholomew – and in French a variant of Baston. The occurrence in Germany is attributable to the influx of Huguenot refugees in the 17th and 18th century. Notable people with this name include:

Chris Batton (born 1954), former American baseball pitcher
Dave Batton (born 1956), retired American basketball player
Désiré-Alexandre Batton (1798–1855), French composer
Gary Batton (born 1966), Native American politician
J. D. Batton (1911–1981), American municipal police chief

References

English-language surnames
French-language surnames